The 1983 Illinois Fighting Illini football team represented the University of Illinois at Urbana-Champaign as a member of the Big Ten Conference during the 1983 NCAA Division I-A football season. Led by fourth-year head coach Mike White, the Fighting Illini compiled an overall record of 10–2 with a mark of 9–0, winning the Big Ten title. Illinois was invited to the Rose Bowl, where the Illini lost to UCLA. The team played home games at Memorial Stadium in Champaign, Illinois.

The team's offensive leaders were quarterback Jack Trudeau with 2,446 passing yards, running back Thomas Rooks with 842 rushing yards, and wide receiver David Williams with 870 receiving yards. Defensive end Don Thorp was selected as the team's most valuable player and also received the Chicago Tribune Silver Football trophy as the most valuable player in the Big Ten Conference. The 1983 Illini were the first team in Big Ten history to go 9–0 in regular season conference play, and the only team to do so until the 2017 Wisconsin Badgers football team repeated the feat.

Schedule

Awards and honors
 Don Thorp (Defensive end)
Chicago Tribune Silver Football
All-American, (defensive end)
 Jim Juriga, (Tackle)
All-American, (tackle)
Craig Swoope, (Defensive back)
All-American, (defensive back)

References

Illinois
Illinois Fighting Illini football seasons
Big Ten Conference football champion seasons
Illinois Fighting Illini football